Zaveh County (Šahrestâne Zave) is in Razavi Khorasan province, Iran. The capital of the county is the city of Dowlatabad. At the 2006 census, the county's population (as Jolgeh Zaveh District of Torbat-e Heydarieh County) was 66,206 in 15,818 households. The following census in 2011 counted 71,677 people in 19,743 households, by which time the district had been separated from the county to form Zaveh County. At the 2016 census, the county's population was 67,695 in 20,063 households.

Administrative divisions

The population history and structural changes of Zaveh County's administrative divisions over three consecutive censuses are shown in the following table. The latest census shows two districts, four rural districts, and one city.

References

 

Counties of Razavi Khorasan Province